The 1880 Birthday Honours were appointments by Queen Victoria to various orders and honours to reward and highlight good works by citizens of the British Empire. The appointments were made to celebrate the official birthday of the Queen, and were published in The London Gazette on 28 May 1880.

The recipients of honours are displayed here as they were styled before their new honour, and arranged by honour, with classes (Knight, Knight Grand Cross, etc.) and then divisions (Military, Civil, etc.) as appropriate.

United Kingdom and British Empire

The Most Distinguished Order of Saint Michael and Saint George

Knight Grand Cross of the Order of St Michael and St George (GCMG)
His Royal Highness Prince Leopold George Duncan Albert, Duke of Saxony, Prince of Saxe Cobourg and Gotha 
General Sir Arthur Borton  Governor of the Island of Malta

Knight Commander of the Order of St Michael and St George (KCMG)
Major George Cumine Strahan  Governor, of the Colony of Tasmania
Frederick Aloysius Weld  Governor of the Straits Settlements
William Vallance Whiteway, Attorney-General and Premier of the Island of Newfoundland

Companion of the Order of St Michael and St George (CMG)
Captain Arthur Elibank Havelock, Chief Civil Commissioner for the Seychelles Islands
Alfred Domett, late Secretary for Crown Lands and Prime Minister for the Colony of New Zealand
John Bates Thurston, Colonial Secretary and Auditor-General of Fiji
Cecil Clementi Smith, Colonial Secretary for the Straits Settlements
Francis John Villiers, Acting Colonial Secretary, Griqualand West

References

Birthday Honours
1880 awards
1880 in the United Kingdom